Tis Autumn is a 1941 jazz standard written by Henry Nemo. It was first recorded by Nat King Cole.

Other recordings
It was later recorded by Chet Baker several times, including his 1959 album Chet, and later with Bill Evans. 
Red Garland recorded it for his 1959 album All Kinds of Weather 
Jackie Paris recorded it for The Song Is Paris  (1962). 
Joe Pass recorded it for several albums, including Simplicity (1967) *Checkmate (1981) and one with Ella Fitzgerald for their 1976 album Fitzgerald and Pass... Again.
American jazz singer Stacey Kent covered it for her 2003 album The Boy Next Door. 
It has also been covered by Stan Getz, Bruce Eskovitz, Carmen McRae, Lee Konitz, Spike Robinson, Eddie Higgins and Bennie Wallace.
While not issued as a record, the song was featured in the 1975 "Brother, Can You Spare an Act?" episode of the TV series Sanford & Son, sung by star Redd Foxx and tiple-playing singer-comedian Timmie Rogers.

References

1941 songs
1940s jazz standards
Nat King Cole songs
Songs written by Henry Nemo